The 2012–13 Columbia Lions men's basketball team represented Columbia University during the 2012–13 NCAA Division I men's basketball season. The Lions, led by third year head coach Kyle Smith, played their home games at Levien Gymnasium and were members of the Ivy League. They finished the season 12–16, 4–10 in Ivy League play to finish in last place.

Roster

Schedule

|-
!colspan=9| Regular Season

References

Columbia Lions men's basketball seasons
Columbia
Lions
Lions